The Old Bank of Amity is a historic commercial building at the northwest corner of the town square in Amity, Arkansas.  It is a two-story red brick building with modest Italianate styling.  It was built in 1906–07, and is the most prominent building of the period in the community.  The Bank of Amity was chartered in 1905 and operated in this building until 1976, when it moved to new premises.

The building was listed on the National Register of Historic Places in 1991.

See also
National Register of Historic Places listings in Clark County, Arkansas

References

Bank buildings on the National Register of Historic Places in Arkansas
Italianate architecture in Arkansas
Buildings and structures in Clark County, Arkansas
National Register of Historic Places in Clark County, Arkansas